The Department of Civil Aviation (also called the DCA) was an Australian government department that existed between November 1938 and November 1973.

History
The Department of Civil Aviation had its origins as the Civil Aviation Branch of the Department of Defence, which was established on 28 March 1921, after Parliament passed the Air Navigation Act 1920 in December 1920.

The organisation was reformed as a separate Government Department after the enquiry into the 1938 Kyeema Crash. When created in 1938, the Department was organised into seven branches: Administration, Transport Services and Legislation, GroundOrganisation, Electrical Engineering, Aeronautical Engineering, Flying Operations and Accounts and Stores. Arthur Brownlow Corbett was appointed Director-General of Civil Aviation in April 1939, serving until his retirement in August 1944. From June 1946 to December 1955 the Director-General was Richard Williams, a former Royal Australian Air Force Chief of the Air Staff. Donald George Anderson held the position of Director-General from January 1956 until September 1973.

On 30 November 1973 the DCA merged with the Department of Shipping and Transport and became the Department of Transport, Air Transport Group. The amalgamation was after the Second Whitlam Ministry agreed that this could achieve closer coordination of policies in the transport field and facilitate a more effective determination of the expenditure priorities and resources allocation.

Structure and scope
The Department was an Australian Public Service department responsible to the Minister for Civil Aviation. The Department was headed by the Director-General.

Information about the department's functions and/or government funding allocation could be found in the Administrative Arrangements Orders, the annual Portfolio Budget Statements and in the Department's annual reports.

The Department dealt with matters relating to civil aviation and administered related legislation.

List of ministers

Notes

References and further reading

See also
Airservices Australia
Civil Aviation Safety Authority

Civil aviation in Australia
Civil Aviation
1938 establishments in Australia
Government agencies established in 1938
1973 disestablishments in Australia
Government agencies disestablished in 1973